In Greek mythology, Machaon was a son of Asclepius; and the older brother of Podalirius. He and his brother led an army from Tricca in the Trojan War on the side of the Greeks.

Description 
Meanwhile, in the account of Dares the Phrygian, Machaon was illustrated as ". . . large and brave, dependable, prudent, patient, and merciful."

Family 
Machaon fathered Nicomachus and Gorgasus by Anticleia, daughter of Diocles of Pharae. His other sons were Alexanor, Sphyrus and Polemocrates.

According to Diogenes Laertius's Lives and Opinions of Eminent Philosophers, Hermippus, in his book On Aristotle, places Machaon as the son of Asclepius, father of Nicomachus, and ancestor of Aristotle.

Mythology 
Both Machaon and Podalirius were highly valued surgeons and medics.  In the Iliad he was wounded and put out of action by Paris. Machaon (or his brother) healed Philoctetes, Telephus and Menelaus, after he sustained an arrow at the hand of Pandarus, during the war.  He was also supposed to possess herbs which were bestowed to his father Asclepius by Chiron, the centaur.

He was killed by Eurypylus in the tenth year of the war. He was buried in Gerenia in Messenia, where he was worshiped by the people.

Legacy

 The Latin name of a butterfly Old World Swallowtail (Papilio machaon) is derived from Machaon.
 Machaonia, a plant genus in Rubiaceae, was named for Machaon.
 The Jovian trojan asteroid 3063 Makhaon is named after him.

Mythology

References 

 Dares Phrygius, from The Trojan War. The Chronicles of Dictys of Crete and Dares the Phrygian translated by Richard McIlwaine Frazer, Jr. (1931-). Indiana University Press. 1966. Online version at theio.com
 Diogenes Laertius, Lives of Eminent Philosophers edited by R.D. Hicks. Cambridge. Harvard University Press. 1972 (First published 1925). Online version at the Perseus Digital Library. Greek text available at the Perseus Digital Library.
Homer, The Iliad with an English Translation by A.T. Murray, Ph.D. in two volumes. Cambridge, MA., Harvard University Press; London, William Heinemann, Ltd. 1924. . Online version at the Perseus Digital Library.
 Homer, Homeri Opera in five volumes. Oxford, Oxford University Press. 1920. . Greek text available at the Perseus Digital Library.
 Pausanias, Description of Greece with an English Translation by W.H.S. Jones, Litt.D., and H.A. Ormerod, M.A., in 4 Volumes. Cambridge, MA, Harvard University Press; London, William Heinemann Ltd. 1918. . Online version at the Perseus Digital Library
 Pausanias, Graeciae Descriptio. 3 vols. Leipzig, Teubner. 1903.  Greek text available at the Perseus Digital Library.
 Quintus Smyrnaeus, The Fall of Troy translated by Way. A. S. Loeb Classical Library Volume 19. London: William Heinemann, 1913. Online version at theio.com
 Quintus Smyrnaeus, The Fall of Troy. Arthur S. Way. London: William Heinemann; New York: G.P. Putnam's Sons. 1913. Greek text available at the Perseus Digital Library.

Children of Asclepius
Achaean Leaders
Mythological Greek physicians